Forestdale is a residential neighbourhood of southeast London in the London Borough of Croydon. It is sometimes considered to be part of Addington, its ancient and ecclesiastical parish. It is located south of Upper Shirley, east of Selsdon, south-west of Addington's historic centre, north-west of New Addington and north of Farleigh.

Geography
Forestdale has public green verges and a nature reserve with diverse walks. Adjoining are Addington and Croydon's closest golf courses. Forestdale is linked to Croydon via Addington by Featherbed Lane which skirts the suburb on one side. 

The suburb consists of cul-de-sacs running off four main roads, the cul-de-sacs being subdivided into several 'neighbourhoods'. All houses within a cul-de-sac are of the same style, but differ from other cul-de-sacs in style and materials, such as weatherboarding, brick colour and arrangement, and so uniformity of style is achieved within one cul-de-sac but differs from the others.

Forestdale contains a community centre (The Forum) on Pixton Way. There is a small row of shops at the junction of Featherbed Lane and Selsdon Park Road, which contains a pub (The Forestdale Arms). The fish & chip shop here (McDermott's) was voted the best in London and the South-East in 2005.

History
Most homes were built here between the late 1960s and mid 1970s on previously open ground containing a number of smallholdings. Wates Group, a construction firm heavily involved in many of the homes' construction, won an award in 1972 due to the solar heating panels they installed in three of the houses.

Transport
Two London Buses serve the village; routes 353 and 433

All parts of Forestdale are within a mile of Tramlink tram stops:
Fieldway
Addington
Gravel Hill, which is also connected via the buses.

Education 
Primary Education
 Courtwood Primary School
 Forestdale Primary School

Gallery

References

Districts of the London Borough of Croydon
Areas of London